FBI is an American crime drama television series created by Dick Wolf and Craig Turk that airs on CBS.
It premiered on September 25, 2018. FBI received a straight-to-series commission for 13 episodes on September 20, 2017. On October 11, 2018, it was announced that the series had received a full season order from CBS. In January 2019, CBS renewed the series for a second season; which premiered on September 24, 2019. Due to the COVID-19 pandemic in the United States, filming was curtailed of the final three episodes of the second season, with the nineteenth episode, "Emotional Rescue", serving as the season finale. In May 2020, CBS renewed the series for a third season, which premiered on November 17, 2020. In March 2021, the series was renewed for a fourth season, which premiered on September 21, 2021. In May 2022, CBS renewed the series for a fifth and sixth season. The fifth season premiered on September 20, 2022.

Series overview

Episodes

Season 1 (2018–19)

Season 2 (2019–20)

Season 3 (2020–21)

Season 4 (2021–22)

Season 5 (2022–23)

Ratings

Season 1

Season 2

Season 3

Season 4

Season 5

Notes

References

External links

FBI (TV series)
Lists of American drama television series episodes